Tell is a Palestinian town in the Nablus Governorate in northern West Bank, located five kilometers southwest of Nablus. According to the Palestinian Central Bureau of Statistics (PCBS), the town had a population of 4,334 inhabitants in 2007. Most of the town's laborers work in agriculture, with figs and olives being the major source of income.

Mohammad Shtayyeh, a Palestinian economist and politician, was born in Tell.

History
Ceramics from the Byzantine era have been found here.

Ottoman era
In 1517, the village was included in the Ottoman empire with the rest of Palestine, and it appeared in the 1596 tax-records as Till, located in the Nahiya of Jabal Qubal of the Liwa of Nablus. The population was 46 households, all Muslim. They paid a  fixed tax rate of 33.3% on agricultural products, such as  wheat, barley, summer crops, olive trees, goats and beehives, in addition to occasional revenues, a press for olive oil or grape syrup, and a fixed tax for people of Nablus area; a total of 5,100 akçe.

In 1838, Till was located in the District of Jurat 'Amra, south of Nablus.

In 1863, Victor Guérin found it to have a population of one thousand inhabitants. It was divided into several districts, each administered by a different sheikh. He further noted: "Some houses are large and fairly well built. Around the village grow, in pens, beautiful plantations of fig and pomegranate trees."  

In 1882, the PEF's Survey of Western Palestine described Till as: "A village of moderate size on low ground, with a high mound behind it on the south; it has a well and a few trees, and on the west a pool in winter; the hills to the north are bare and white, but terraced to the very top."

British mandate era
In the 1922 census of Palestine conducted by the British Mandate authorities, Tel had a population of 567 Muslims, increasing in the 1931 census to 803 Muslims, in 209 houses.

In the 1945 statistics the population was 1,060 Muslims, while the total land area was 13,766 dunams, according to an official land and population survey. 
Of this, 1,056 dunams were for plantations and irrigable land, 7,023 for cereals, while 55 dunams were classified as built-up areas.

Jordanian era
In the wake of the 1948 Arab–Israeli War, and after the 1949 Armistice Agreements, Tell came under  Jordanian rule.

The Jordanian census of 1961 found 1,539 inhabitants.

1967, aftermath
Since the Six-Day War in 1967, Tell has been held under Israeli military occupation.

References

Bibliography

External links
Welcome to Tall
Survey of Western Palestine, Map 11:    IAA, Wikimedia commons 
 Tell, aerial  photo,  Applied Research Institute–Jerusalem (ARIJ) 

Nablus Governorate
Villages in the West Bank
Municipalities of the State of Palestine